Gil-dong Station is a subway station on Seoul Subway Line 5 in Gangdong-gu, Seoul.

Station layout

Vicinity
Exit 1 : Cheondong Elementary School
Exit 2 : Gildong Elementary School, Gangdong Library
Exit 3 : Gangdong Post Office

References 

Seoul Metropolitan Subway stations
Metro stations in Gangdong District
Railway stations opened in 1995